Kanao Inouye (May 24, 1916 – August 27, 1947) was a Canadian citizen of Japanese descent, convicted of high treason and war crimes for his actions during World War II. Known as the "Kamloops Kid", he served as an interpreter and prison camp guard for the Imperial Japanese Army and the Kenpeitai political police.

Early life in Canada 
A Nisei (second-generation Japanese-Canadian), Kanao Inouye was born to immigrant parents in Kamloops, British Columbia. His father, Tadashi Inouye, had emigrated to British Columbia from Tokyo, and had been a decorated Canadian soldier during World War I. Although his father died in 1926, Inouye at his first trial described his life in Canada as happy. His family nevertheless maintained close ties to Japan, where his grandfather, Chotahara Inouye, was a Member of Parliament in the House of Peers. After he graduated from Vancouver Technical School, Inouye's family urged him to go to Japan to continue his education. He did so in 1938 and was still there when World War II began.

War years
In 1942, Inouye was conscripted into the Imperial Japanese Army as an interpreter. Made a sergeant, he was assigned to Sham Shui Po prison camp in Hong Kong, which housed Canadian prisoners of war from the Hong Kong Garrison. Inouye was noted for his unusual brutality. He beat prisoners at random, stating it was in retaliation for racism and discrimination that he had received in Canada. In contrast to his later trial testimony about his childhood, he allegedly told them: "When I was in Canada I took all kinds of abuse. ... They called me a 'little yellow bastard'. Now where is your so-called superiority, you dirty scum?"

Inouye was discharged from the army the following year, but in 1944 he was conscripted as an interpreter for the notorious Kenpeitai military police in Hong Kong. Trial testimony stated he had been an enthusiastic torturer of suspected spies and traitors. Former POWs said that Inouye was responsible for the torture of multiple Canadian POWs and other civilians.

Conviction and execution 
After the Japanese capitulation in August 1945, Inouye was arrested in Kowloon and tried for war crimes by a British military court. In 1946, he was found guilty of torturing prisoners of war and civilians. Inouye had been accused of murdering four detainees, but was acquitted of those charges. Under normal circumstances, the lesser verdict would've spared his life, since British war crimes courts did not condemn anyone to death if none of their victims had died. However, Inouye was sentenced to death on the grounds that his Canadian citizenship constituted a serious aggravating factor.

The verdict was overturned on appeal, since as a Canadian citizen, Inouye could not be prosecuted for war crimes committed by an enemy army. In April 1947, Inouye was tried for high treason. He found guilty and sentenced to death. On August 27, 1947, Inouye was executed by hanging on the gallows at Hong Kong's Stanley Prison. His last word was "Banzai!"

Legacy 
Inouye was one of arguably only two Canadians in history to have faced prosecution for war crimes (the second being Omar Khadr, who in 2010 pleaded guilty to what the Guantanamo military commission termed war crimes committed in Afghanistan, though he has since been pardoned).

See also
 Battle of Hong Kong
 Japanese occupation of Hong Kong
 Tomoya Kawakita

Citations

1916 births
1947 deaths
Canadian people convicted of war crimes
Canadian people of Japanese descent
 Executed Canadian collaborators with Imperial Japan
Japanese people executed for war crimes
Imperial Japanese Army personnel of World War II
Imperial Japanese Army soldiers
Military discipline and World War II
People executed by the British military by hanging
People executed for treason against the United Kingdom
People from Kamloops
Racially motivated violence against white people